500 años fregados pero cristianos (English: 500 Years Screwed But Christian) is a 1992 illustrated book by Mexican cartoonist and writer Rius that was published by Grijalbo. The book is a sharp criticism of the Spanish conquest, the Catholic Church, and the current condition of the indigenous people of Latin America, who still are victims of humiliations and human rights violations. The idea of the book came about when the Mexican government started to make propaganda on the celebration of the 500 years of the discovery of the New World. The book tries to demystify the figure of Columbus and the Spanish missionaries who followed him.

The book is divided into nine chapters:
 On the poor scum who was Columbus
 What if the Aztecs had conquered Spain?
 How the Spaniards mistook the Chinese civilization for the Mexican
 On human sacrifices
 On the Christianisation of the Natives
 On the kind and Christian things made in the New World
 The spiritual conquest; the first step toward perpetual underdevelopment
 On the so-called "Holy" Inquisition
 Where the reader may see the results of the civilization they gave us

See also
Cartoonism
Atheism in Mexico

References

External links
 Random House Mondadori - 500 years screwed but Christian
 Official Rius website
 Rius' recent works
 Random House
 La Trobe University - Eduardo del Río

1992 books
Books critical of Christianity
Spanish-language books